Winter Moon may refer to:
Winter Moon (album), a 1980 album by Art Pepper
"Winter Moon", song by Bradley Joseph on the 1999 album Solo Journey
Winter Moon, revised reissue of Invasion (1975 novel), a novel by Dean Koontz